Joan Tate née Eames (23 September 1922 – 6 June 2000) was a prolific author and translator, translating works by many leading Swedish and Swedish-speaking Finnish writers into English.

Alongside her own fiction and nonfiction writing, Tate's translations from the Swedish include books by Astrid Lindgren, Ingmar Bergman, Britt Ekland, Kerstin Ekman, P C Jersild, Sven Lindqvist, Agneta Pleijel, and the team of Maj Sjöwall and Per Wahlöö. She also translated works from Norwegian and Danish, translating a total of around 200 books during her career.

External links
Obituary and biography 

1922 births
2000 deaths
Swedish–English translators
Danish–English translators
Norwegian–English translators
20th-century translators